Nawabpet is a village in Vikarabad district of the Indian state of Telangana. It is located in Nawabpet mandal of Vikarabad revenue division.

Geography 

Nawabpet Mandal is located at (17.436654, 77.962911).

References 

Villages in Vikarabad district
Mandal headquarters in Vikarabad district